Government Inter College Faizabad or GIC-Faizabad is one of the oldest middle schools of Faizabad, Uttar Pradesh, India. It was established in 1883.

GIC Faizabad is governed by Board of High School and Intermediate Education Uttar Pradesh, Allahabad.

Awards
 Ramesh Chandra, Asstt. Teacher (Science & Maths) was awarded Science Teacher Samman in 2006-2007 by Council of Science & Technology U.P. 
 Vishal Chandra was awarded by " Gold Medal " in "Pt. Jawaharlal Nehru State Level Science Exhibition, Allahabad" 2005–2006. 
 Vishal Chandra was awarded by " State Child Scientist Award " in 2007-2008 by Council of Science & Technology U.P.

Notable alumni
 Panna Lal (b.1921), politician
 Nirmal Khatri (b. 1951), politician
 Vishal Chandra (b.2005) Researcher and Entrepreneur (Owner-Digital Ashava)

References 

Intermediate colleges in Uttar Pradesh
Education in Faizabad
Educational institutions established in 1883
1883 establishments in India
Buildings and structures in Faizabad

वर्तमान सी बी एस ई सचिव अनुराग त्रिपाठी भी जी आई सी फैजाबाद की ही देन हैं